"Here as in Heaven" is a song performed by American contemporary worship band Elevation Worship. The song was released as the opening track of the fifth live album of the same name on February 5, 2016. The song was written by Chris Brown, Mack Brock, Matthews Ntlele, Steven Furtick, and Wade Joye.

"Here as in Heaven" debuted at No. 17 on the US Hot Christian Songs chart despite not being released as an official single. It has been certified gold by Recording Industry Association of America (RIAA).

Composition

Commercial performance
"Here as in Heaven" debuted at No. 17 on the US Hot Christian Songs chart dated February 27, 2016, concurrently charting at No. 8 on the Christian Digital Song Sales chart. The song spent 21 weeks on the Hot Christian Songs chart.

Music videos
On November 13, 2015, Elevation Worship published the acoustic performance video of "Here as in Heaven" on YouTube. On February 5, 2016, Elevation Worship released the official live music video of "Here as in Heaven" on YouTube. It was recorded live at Time Warner Cable Arena in Charlotte, North Carolina, in July 2015.

Charts

Certifications

Other versions
 Kari Jobe released her own rendition of the song which featured Cody Carnes on the deluxe edition of her album, The Garden (2017).

References

External links
 

2016 songs
Elevation Worship songs
Songs written by Steven Furtick